Crater Precinct is located in Calhoun County, Illinois, USA.  As of the 2020 census the population was 502, a decline from 525 at the 2010 census.

The precinct was formed in 1834 from Belleview Precinct as part of Illinois Precinct (comprising modern-day Carlin and Crater Precincts) and was separated in 1839.

Geography 

Demographics 

As of the 2020 census there were 502 people, 198 households, and 148 families residing in the precinct. The racial makeup of the precinct was 91.24% White, 0.00% African American, 1.39% Native American, 0.00% Asian, 0.00% Pacific Islander, 0.00% from other races, and 7.37% from two or more races. Hispanic or Latino of any race were 2.19% of the population.

There were 198 households, out of which 36.40% had children under the age of 18 living with them, 63.13% were married couples living together, 10.10% had a female householder with no spouse present, and 25.25% were non-families. 25.30% of all households were made up of individuals, and 7.60% had someone living alone who was 65 years of age or older. The average household size was 2.53 and the average family size was 3.03.

The precinct's age distribution consisted of 28.0% under the age of 18, 13.1% from 18 to 24, 22.8% from 25 to 44, 22.1% from 45 to 64, and 13.9% who were 65 years of age or older. The median age was 30.5 years. For every 100 females, there were 94.7 males. For every 100 females age 18 and over, there were 84.7 males.

The median income for a household in the precinct was $57,778, and the median income for a family was $100,000. Males had a median income of $51,000 versus $20,938 for females. The per capita income for the precinct was $26,344. About 16.9% of families and 19.0% of the population were below the poverty line, including 36.6% of those under age 18 and 16.7% of those age 65 or over.

References

External links 
US Census
Illinois State Archives

Precincts in Calhoun County, Illinois